The Lvng RM EP is a collection of recordings from Jaymay's 2005 residency at the Living Room music venue on New York City's Lower East Side. The performances capture Jaymay live with a band for the very first time.

This live version of "You Are The Only One I Love" is featured in Facebook's 2014 and 2015 Mother's Day national television commercial in the United States.

Track listing
All songs written by Jaymay
 "You Are The Only One I Love (live)" – 4:24
 "Table For Two (live)" – 4:04
 "Lucca (live)" – 3:13
 "I Can't Change (live)" – 3:51
 "One Day Loneliness (live)" – 2:28
 "On & On (live)" – 3:38
 "Tragedy (live)" – 3:08

Personnel
Musicians
Jaymay – Guitar and vocals
Nico Georis – Piano, accordion, vocals
Jared Engel – Bass, vocals
Stephen Chopek – Drums

Production
Recorded by Eric Lippe
Patrick MacDougall – Mixing
Robert Vosgien – Mastering
Diana Seerman – Cover photo
Rory Wilson – Album layout

References

2010 live albums
Jaymay albums